The following is a list of Stars in Their Eyes episodes from the British talent show, which originally aired on television network ITV from 1990 to 2006, and was briefly revived in 2015.

Episode list
Colour key:
 Indicates that the contestant won the episode and qualified for the grand final
 Indicates the "wildcard" contestant that series
 Indicates the winning contestant or series champion (1st)
 Indicates the runner-up contestant (2nd)

Original series

1990

Series 1
Episode 1 (21 July 1990)

Episode 2 (28 July 1990)

Episode 3 (4 August 1990)

Episode 4 (11 August 1990)

Episode 5 (18 August 1990)

Grand Final (25 August 1990)

1991

Series 2
Episode 1 (8 June 1991)

Episode 2 (15 June 1991)

Episode 3 (22 June 1991)

Episode 4 (29 June 1991)

Episode 5 (6 July 1991)

Grand Final (13 July 1991)
With special guest Maxine Barrie as Shirley Bassey performing "This is My Life"

Christmas Special (28 December 1991)

1992

Series 3
Episode 1 (22 February 1992)

Episode 2 (29 February 1992)

Episode 3 (7 March 1992)

Episode 4 (14 March 1992)

Episode 5 (21 March 1992)

Grand Final (28 March 1992)
With special guest Bernard Wenton as Nat King Cole performing "Unforgettable"

1993
Elvis Special (2 January 1993)

Series 4
Episode 1 (22 May 1993)

Episode 2 (29 May 1993)

Episode 3 (5 June 1993)

Episode 4 (12 June 1993)

Episode 5 (19 June 1993)

Episode 6 (26 June 1993)

Episode 7 (3 July 1993)

Episode 8 (10 July 1993)

Episode 9 (17 July 1993)

Live Grand Final (24 July 1993)
With special guest Amanda Normansell as Patsy Cline performing "Sweet Dreams"

2 Performed twice on Stars in Their Eyes. The first was in the fifth episode of the first series.

NOTE: The finalists started in the order of the episode they won.

Christmas Special (1 January 1994)

NOTE: The only 1993 finalist not to return was Pat Cairns as Kenny Rogers, possibly because he was unavailable.

1994
Stars in Their Eyes Special (7 May 1994)

Series 5
Episode 1 (14 May 1994)

Episode 2 (21 May 1994)

Episode 3 (28 May 1994)

Episode 4 (4 June 1994)

Episode 5 (11 June 1994)

Episode 6 (18 June 1994)

Episode 7 (25 June 1994)

2 Performed twice on Stars in Their Eyes. The first was in the second episode of the first series.

Episode 8 (2 July 1994)

Episode 9 (9 July 1994)

2 Performed twice on Stars in Their Eyes. The first was in the second episode of the second series.

Live Grand Final (16 July 1994)
With special guest Jacqui Cann as Alison Moyet performing "Whispering Your Name"

Winners Special (24 December 1994)

1995

Series 6
Episode 1 (6 May 1995)

Episode 2 (13 May 1995)

Episode 3 (20 May 1995)

Episode 4 (27 May 1995)

Episode 5 (3 June 1995)

Episode 6 (10 June 1995)

Episode 7 (17 June 1995)

Episode 8 (24 June 1995)

Episode 9 (1 July 1995)

Live Grand Final (8 July 1995)
 With special guest John Finch as Marti Pellow performing "Goodnight Girl"

NOTE: After the grand total for Obi Anyanwu as James Ingram (winner of Episode 6) was announced, Matthew Kelly announced - while the edition was off the air - that a record company had rung up and offered Anyanwu a contract.

Christmas Special (23 December 1995)

1996

Series 7
Episode 1 (2 March 1996)

Episode 2 (9 March 1996)

Episode 3 (16 March 1996)

Episode 4 (23 March 1996)

Episode 5 (30 March 1996)

Episode 6 (6 April 1996)

Episode 7 (13 April 1996)

Episode 8 (20 April 1996)

Episode 9 (27 April 1996)

Episode 10 (4 May 1996)

Episode 11 (11 May 1996)

Episode 12 (18 May 1996)

Live Grand Final (25 May 1996)

 With special guest Lee Griffiths as Bobby Darin performing "Mack the Knife"

1997

Series 8
Episode 1 (15 March 1997)

Episode 2 (22 March 1997)

Episode 3 (29 March 1997)

Episode 4 (5 April 1997)

2 Performed twice on Stars in Their Eyes. The first was in the third episode of the second series.

Episode 5 (12 April 1997)

Episode 6 (19 April 1997)

Episode 7 (26 April 1997)

Episode 8 (3 May 1997)

Episode 9 (10 May 1997)

Episode 10 (17 May 1997)

Episode 11 (24 May 1997)

Episode 12 (31 May 1997)

Live Grand Final (7 June 1997)

 With special guest Paul Doody as Marti Pellow performing "Somewhere Somehow"

NOTE: This was the first live final to use a computer-generated scoreboard, rather than a display unit on the studio floor.

1998

Series 9
Episode 1 (21 March 1998)

Episode 2 (28 March 1998)

Episode 3 (4 April 1998)

Episode 4 (11 April 1998)

Episode 5 (18 April 1998)

2 Performed twice on Stars in Their Eyes. The first was in the third episode of the first series.
Episode 6 (25 April 1998)

Episode 7 (2 May 1998)

Episode 8 (9 May 1998)

Episode 9 (16 May 1998)

Episode 10 (23 May 1998)

Episode 11 (30 May 1998)

Episode 12 (6 June 1998)

Live Grand Final (13 June 1998)

 With special guest Faye Dempsey as Olivia Newton-John performing "Hopelessly Devoted to You"

Celebrity special (2 December 1998)

3 Performed three times on Stars in Their Eyes. The first was in the third episode of the second series, and the second was in the fourth episode of the eighth series.

1999

Series 10
Episode 1 (13 March 1999)

Episode 2 (20 March 1999)

Episode 3 (27 March 1999)

Episode 4 (3 April 1999)

Episode 5 (10 April 1999)

Episode 6 (17 April 1999)

Episode 7 (24 April 1999)

Episode 8 (1 May 1999)

2 Performed twice on Stars in Their Eyes. The first was in the second episode of the first series.

Episode 9 (8 May 1999)

Episode 10 (15 May 1999)

Episode 11 (22 May 1999)

Episode 12 (29 May 1999)

Live Grand Final (5 June 1999)

 With special guest Jason Searle as Neil Diamond performing "Hello Again"

Celebrity special (9 October 1999)

Champion of Champions (30 October 1999)

2000
Celebrity special (1 January 2000)

Series 11
Episode 1 (11 March 2000)

Episode 2 (18 March 2000)

Episode 3 (25 March 2000)

Episode 4 (1 April 2000)

Episode 5 (8 April 2000)

Episode 6 (15 April 2000)

3 Performed three times on Stars in Their Eyes. The first was in the second episode of the second series, and the second was in the ninth episode of the fifth series.

Episode 7 (22 April 2000)

Episode 8 (29 April 2000)

2 Performed twice on Stars in Their Eyes. The first was in the eighth episode of the sixth series.

Episode 9 (6 May 2000)

Episode 10 (13 May 2000)

Live Grand Final (20 May 2000)

 With special guests Ian Moor (performing as Chris De Burgh) and Chris de Burgh performing "The Lady in Red"

Celebrity special (1 July 2000)

Celebrity special (16 September 2000)

Series 12
Episode 1 (23 September 2000)

Episode 2 (30 September 2000)

Episode 3 (7 October 2000)

Episode 4 (14 October 2000)

Episode 5 (21 October 2000)

Episode 6 (28 October 2000)

Episode 7 (4 November 2000)

Episode 8 (11 November 2000)

Episode 9 (18 November 2000)

Episode 10 (25 November 2000)

Live Grand Final (2 December 2000)

 With special guest Gary Mullen as Freddie Mercury performing "I Want to Break Free"

NOTE: At the end of each finalists' performance, Matthew Kelly would present them with a gift (only if he had something to give them).

Christmas Special (26 December 2000)

2001
European Championships (14 April 2001)

The judges were:
Jo de Poorter (Netherlands)
István Vágó (Hungary)
Cheryl Baker (United Kingdom)
Vibeke Strom (Norway)
Nova Meierhenrich (Germany)
Lea Kristensen (Sweden)
Lorenzo Totaro (Italy)
Kürt Rogiers (Belgium)
Bárbara Guimarães (Portugal)
Claudia G (Spain)

Series 13
Episode 1 (5 May 2001)

Episode 2 (12 May 2001)

Episode 3 (19 May 2001)

Episode 4 (26 May 2001)

Episode 5 (2 June 2001)

Episode 6 (9 June 2001)

Episode 7 (16 June 2001)

Episode 8 (23 June 2001)

Episode 9 (30 June 2001)

Episode 10 (7 July 2001)

Live Grand Final (14 July 2001)

 With special guest Nicola Kirsch as Maria Callas performing "O mio babbino caro"

Popstars special (6 October 2001)

Coronation Street special (24 November 2001)

Christmas special (25 December 2001)

2002

Series 14
Episode 1 (16 February 2002)

Episode 2 (23 February 2002)

Episode 3 (2 March 2002)

Episode 4 (9 March 2002)

Episode 5 (16 March 2002)

Episode 6 (23 March 2002)

Episode 7 (30 March 2002)

Episode 8 (6 April 2002)

Episode 9 (13 April 2002)

Episode 10 (20 April 2002)

Live Grand Final (27 April 2002)

 With special guest Emma Wilkinson as Dusty Springfield performing "Son of a Preacher Man"

Celebrity divas Special (4 May 2002)

Coronation Street special (11 May 2002)

Popstars special (17 August 2002)

Junior series 1 (2001 - Pilot) / (2002 - Rest of Series)
Pilot/Episode 1 (21 July 2001, repeated 24 August 2002)

Episode 2 (31 August 2002)

Episode 3 (7 September 2002)

Episode 4 (14 September 2002)

Episode 5 (21 September 2002)

Episode 6 (28 September 2002)

Live Grand Final (5 October 2002)

European Championships 2
The judges were:
Agneta Sjödin (Sweden)
Bruno Sokolowicz (Spain)
Kari Hansmark (Norway)
Ellen Hidding (Italy)
Louis Walsh (Ireland)
Seth Kamphuijs (Netherlands)
Claire Sweeney (United Kingdom)
Catarina Furtado (Portugal)
Sonny Oroir (Belgium)
Mousse T. (Germany)
Part 1 (26 October 2002)

Part 2 (2 November 2002)

Celebrity Christmas special (28 December 2002)

2003
Legends special (1 February 2003)

Coronation Street special (8 February 2003)

Soapstars special (22 February 2003)

Junior series 2
Episode 1 (5 April 2003)

Episode 2 (12 April 2003)

Episode 3 (19 April 2003)

Episode 4 (26 April 2003)

Episode 5 (3 May 2003)

Episode 6 (10 May 2003)

Episode 7 (17 May 2003)

Episode 8 (24 May 2003)

Live Grand Final (31 May 2003)

I'm A Celebrity...Get Me Out of Here! special (16 August 2003)

Soapstars special (23 August 2003)

Celebrity Christmas special (27 December 2003)

2004

Series 15
Episode 1 (3 January 2004)

Episode 2 (10 January 2004)

Episode 3 (17 January 2004)

Episode 4 (24 January 2004)

Episode 5 (31 January 2004)

Episode 6 (7 February 2004)

Episode 7 (14 February 2004)

Episode 8 (21 February 2004)

Episode 9 (28 February 2004)

Episode 10 (6 March 2004)

Live Grand Final (13 March 2004)

NOTE: For the first time since the first three series, the finalists started in a random order.

Celebrity special (24 April 2004)

Soapstars special (1 May 2004)

Celebrity special (8 May 2004)

Junior series 3
Episode 1 (20 March 2004)

Episode 2 (27 March 2004)

Episode 3 (3 April 2004)

Episode 4 (10 April 2004)

Episode 5 (17 April 2004)

Episode 6 (24 April 2004)

Episode 7 (1 May 2004)

Episode 8 (8 May 2004)

Live Grand Final (15 May 2004)

Celebrity special (26 June 2004)

Celebrity Christmas special (18 December 2004)

2005

Series 16
Episode 1 (15 January 2005)

Episode 2 (22 January 2005)

Episode 3 (29 January 2005)

Episode 4 (5 February 2005)

Episode 5 (12 February 2005)

Episode 6 (19 February 2005)

Episode 7 (27 February 2005)

Episode 8 (5 March 2005)

Episode 9 (12 March 2005)

Episode 10 (19 March 2005)

Live Grand Final (26 March 2005)

NOTE: The winner of Episode 3, Kelvin Utter as Al Green, did not appear due to personal reasons.

Celebrity special (2 April 2005)

Celebrity special (23 July 2005)

Soapstars special (30 July 2005)

Reality TV special (6 August 2005)

Celebrity special (13 August 2005)

Celebrity duets special (24 December 2005)

2006
Family special (7 January 2006)

Junior series 4
Episode 1 (21 January 2006)

Episode 2 (28 January 2006)

Episode 3 (4 February 2006)

Episode 4 (11 February 2006)

Episode 5 (18 February 2006)

Episode 6 (25 February 2006)

Episode 7 (4 March 2006)

Episode 8 (11 March 2006)

Live Grand Final (18 March 2006)

Celebrity special (25 March 2006)

Celebrity special (1 April 2006)

Celebrity special (8 April 2006)

Celebrity special (23 December 2006)

Revival series

Series 1 (2015)
Episode 1 (10 January 2015)

Episode 2 (17 January 2015)

Episode 3 (24 January 2015)

Episode 4 (31 January 2015)

Episode 5 (7 February 2015)

Not Live Final (14 February 2015)

Starstruck

Unaired episodes
These are episodes that were recorded but were never aired. 
Unaired Stars in Their Eyes Celebrity Special 1

Unaired Stars in Their Eyes Celebrity Special 2

References

External links
Grand Final results including Celebrity and Kids versions
TV.com Episode guide

Lists of British non-fiction television series episodes